Mad is a village and municipality in the Dunajská Streda District in the Trnava Region of south-west Slovakia.

Geography
The municipality lies at an altitude of 114 metres and covers an area of 7.714 km².

History
In the 9th century, the territory of Mad became part of the Kingdom of Hungary. The village was first recorded in 1254 as Mod, in 1260 as Nagmod. Until the end of World War I, it was part of Hungary and fell within the Dunaszerdahely district of Pozsony County. Mad was the hometown of Rabbi Abraham Judah ha-Kohen Schwartz. After the Austro-Hungarian army disintegrated in November 1918, Czechoslovakian troops occupied the area. After the Treaty of Trianon of 1920, the village became officially part of Czechoslovakia. In November 1938, the First Vienna Award granted the area to Hungary and it was held by Hungary until 1945. After Soviet occupation in 1945, Czechoslovakian administration returned and the village became officially part of Czechoslovakia in 1947.

Demography 
In 1910, the village had 438, for the most part, Hungarian inhabitants. At the 2001 Census the recorded population of the village was 469 while an end-2008 estimate by the Statistical Office had the village's population as 509. As of 2001, 95.74 per cent of its population was Hungarian while 4.05 per cent was Slovak. Roman Catholicism is the majority religion of the village, its adherents numbering 69.51% of the total population.

References

External links
Map of the area by Google maps

Villages and municipalities in Dunajská Streda District